Jesús Darwin Ramírez Umpierrez (born July 12, 1988 in Montevideo) is a Uruguayan footballer who plays as a striker for Villa Teresa in the Uruguayan Segunda División.

Career
Ramirez played in Peru with Club Universidad Técnica de Cajamarca and Sport Rosario.

Teams
  Central Español 2008-2009
  Defensor Sporting 2010
  Central Español 2011
  El Tanque Sisley 2011
  Visé 2011
  El Tanque Sisley 2012
  Estudiantes Tecos 2012
  Villa Teresa 2012-2013
  Cobán Imperial 2014
  Cobán Imperial 2015
  El Tanque Sisley 2016
  UTC Cajamarca 2016
  Sport Rosario 2017

References

External links
 
 Darwín Ramírez at playmakerstats.com (English version of ceroacero.es)

1988 births
Living people
Uruguayan footballers
Uruguayan expatriate footballers
Central Español players
Defensor Sporting players
El Tanque Sisley players
C.S. Visé players
Universidad Técnica de Cajamarca footballers
Tecos F.C. footballers
Expatriate footballers in Belgium
Expatriate footballers in Mexico
Association football forwards